Charrúa Gap (Sedlovina Charrúa \se-dlo-vi-'na cha-'ru-a\) is a flat ice-covered saddle extending  in east-west direction between Castillo Nunatak and Charrúa Ridge on Hurd Peninsula, eastern Livingston Island at an elevation of .

The gap separates the glacial catchments of Balkan Snowfield and Contell Glacier to the north and Huntress Glacier and Johnsons Glacier.  The glacial catchments of the last two glaciers are separated by a nameless ice-covered saddle extending  between the midpoint of Charrúa Gap to the north and Napier Peak to the south.  A small nameless lake is ice-dammed in a deep hollow to the east of Charrúa Ridge.  The feature takes its name from the adjacent Charrúa Ridge.

The Charrúa Gap is part of several overland routes, for example between the Bulgarian base and the Spanish base, from the Bulgarian base to the southern region of Hurd Peninsula and from the Spanish base to Burdick Ridge, Friesland Ridge and Bowles Ridge areas.

The gap was mapped by the UK Directorate of Overseas Surveys in 1968 and a detailed mapping was made by the Spanish Servicio Geográfico del Ejército in 1991. Co-ordinates, elevation and distances given according to a 1995-96 Bulgarian topographic survey.

Location

Maps
 Isla Livingston: Península Hurd. Mapa topográfico de escala 1:25000. Madrid: Servicio Geográfico del Ejército, 1991. (Map reproduced on p. 16 of the linked work)
 L.L. Ivanov et al. Antarctica: Livingston Island and Greenwich Island, South Shetland Islands. Scale 1:100000 topographic map. Sofia: Antarctic Place-names Commission of Bulgaria, 2005.
 L.L. Ivanov. Antarctica: Livingston Island and Greenwich, Robert, Snow and Smith Islands. Scale 1:120000 topographic map.  Troyan: Manfred Wörner Foundation, 2009.  
 Antarctic Digital Database (ADD). Scale 1:250000 topographic map of Antarctica. Scientific Committee on Antarctic Research (SCAR). Since 1993, regularly upgraded and updated.
 L.L. Ivanov. Antarctica: Livingston Island and Smith Island. Scale 1:100000 topographic map. Manfred Wörner Foundation, 2017.

References
 Charrúa Gap. SCAR Composite Gazetteer of Antarctica
 Bulgarian Antarctic Gazetteer. Antarctic Place-names Commission. (details in Bulgarian, basic data in English)

External links
 Charrúa Gap. Copernix satellite image

Mountain passes of Livingston Island